Norborneol may refer to alcohols with the norbornane skeleton:

endo-Norborneol
exo-Norborneol